The Diocese of Eichstätt is a diocese of the Catholic Church in Bavaria. Its seat is Eichstätt, and it is subordinate to the archbishop of Bamberg. The diocese was erected in 745; from the Middle Ages until 1805, it was a state of the Holy Roman Empire. The current bishop of Eichstätt is  Dr. Gregor Maria Hanke, OSB; formerly the Abbot of the Benedictine Abbey of Plankstetten, he was named to the See by Pope Benedict XVI on 14 October 2006, and he was consecrated at the Cathedral of Eichstätt on 2 December 2006. The diocese covers an area of 6,025 km², with 48,9% (as per 31 Dez. 2006) just under half of the population is catholic.

List of bishops
 List of bishops of Eichstätt

History

The diocese was erected by Saint Boniface in 745; it was subordinate to the archbishop of Mainz. By the Bavarian Concordat of 1817, the diocese was reorganized and made subordinate to the archbishop of Bamberg.

Ordinaries

Johann von Eych (1 October 1445 Appointed – 1 January 1464 Died)
Wilhelm von Reichenau (16 January 1464 Appointed – 9 November 1496 Died)
Gabriel von Eyb (5 December 1496 Appointed – 1 December 1535 Died)
Christoph Marschalk zu Pappenheim (14 December 1535 Appointed – 13 June 1539 Died)
Moritz von Hutten (26 June 1539 Appointed – 6 December 1552 Died)
Eberhard von Hirnheim (22 December 1552 Appointed – 4 July 1560 Died)
Martin von Schaumberg (14 July 1560 Appointed – 28 June 1590 Died)
Kaspar von Seckendorff (13 August 1590 Appointed – 2 April 1595 Died)
Johann Konrad von Gemmingen (2 April 1595 Succeeded – 8 November 1612 Died)
Johann Christoph von Westerstetten (4 December 1612 Appointed – 28 July 1637 Died)
Marquard Reichsgraf von Schenk von Castell (28 July 1637 Appointed – 18 January 1685 Died)
Johann Euchar Reichsgraf von Schenk von Castell (13 March 1685 Appointed – 6 March 1697 Died)
Johann Martin Reichsritter von Eyb (16 April 1697 Appointed – 6 December 1704 Died)
Johann Anton Reichsfreiherr von Knebel von Katzenellenbogen (9 February 1705 Appointed – 27 April 1725 Died)
Franz Ludwig Reichsfreiherr von Schenk von Castell (3 July 1725 Appointed – 19 September 1736 Died)
Johann Anton Reichsfreiherr von Freyberg-Hopferau (5 December 1736 Appointed – 30 April 1757 Died)
Raymund Anton Graf von Strasoldo (5 July 1757 Appointed – 13 January 1781 Died)
Johann Anton Freiherr von Zehmen (27 March 1781 Appointed – 23 June 1790 Died)
Joseph Graf von Stubenberg (21 September 1790 Appointed – 5 February 1818 Appointed, Archbishop of Bamberg)
Petrus Pustet (4 Mar 1824 Appointed – 24 Apr 1825 Died)
Johann Friedrich Oesterreicher (12 May 1825 Appointed – 31 January 1835 Died)
Johann Martin Manl (25 March 1835 Appointed – 15 October 1835 Died)
Karl August Graf von Reisach (19 April 1836 Appointed – 12 July 1841 Appointed, Coadjutor Archbishop of München und Freising)
Georg von Oettl (3 October 1846 Appointed – 6 February 1866 Died)
Franz Leopold Freiherr von Leonrod (13 November 1866 Appointed – 5 September 1905 Died)
Johannes Leo von Mergel, O.S.B. (5 October 1905 Appointed – 20 June 1932 Died)
Konrad von Preysing (9 September 1932 Appointed – 5 July 1935 Appointed, Bishop of Berlin)
Michael Rackl (4 November 1935 Appointed – 5 May 1948 Died)
Joseph Schröffer (23 July 1948 Appointed – 2 January 1968 Appointed, Titular Archbishop of Volturnum)
Alois Brems (28 May 1968 Appointed – 1 June 1983 Retired)
Karl Heinrich Braun (17 April 1984 Appointed – 25 March 1995 Appointed, Archbishop of Bamberg)
Walter Mixa (24 February 1996 Appointed – 16 July 2005 Appointed, Bishop of Augsburg)
Gregor Maria Franz Hanke, O.S.B. (14 October 2006 Appointed – )

References

External links
  Official site
 

745 establishments
Dioceses established in the 8th century
Christianity in Bavaria
Roman Catholic dioceses in Germany
Roman Catholic dioceses in the Holy Roman Empire
 
8th-century establishments in Germany
Eichstätt